The Race Club is a swimming club known for training Olympic Games swimmers with its swimming training program that is focused on specific swimming techniques, located in Islamorada, Florida.

History
The Race Club was founded in 2003  by Gary Hall, Jr., an American swimmer who competed in the 1996, 2000, and 2004 Olympics and won ten Olympic medals (5 gold, 3 silver, 2 bronze).

A managing partner of The Race Club is Gary Hall, Jr.'s father, Gary Hall, Sr., a three-time Olympic medalist (1968, 1972 and 1976) who was voted the World’s greatest male swimmer in both 1969 and 1970.   At the Montreal 1976 Summer Olympics, Hall's teammates voted him to be the flag bearer who led the U.S. Olympic Team into Olympic Stadium for the Opening ceremonies.

The Halls became the first pair of father and son to each make three Olympic appearances.

In 2004, swimmers from The Race Club won 6 Olympic medals at the Athens Olympic Games.  In 2006, The Race Club began offering summer swim camps for swimmers of any age to learn how to swim faster.  In 2008, 17 swimmers representing 15 countries that trained with The Race Club competed in the Beijing Olympics. Two more Olympic medals were won. All swam personal best times.

Swimming training program
The Race Club swimming training programs incorporate five disciplines; swim training, strength training, mental training (sport psychology), nutrition and recovery (healing). The Race Club facilities are located at Founders Park in Islamorada, Fla.  The 50-meter swimming pool features eight lanes and a 12-foot diving pool.

Swimming nutrition
To complement the swimming training program, The Race Club offers specialized nutrition for swimmers focused on competitive swimming nutrition.

Swimming video
The Race club utilizes specialized underwater photography equipment to create swimming technique videos, and can video a swimmer from under water or above the water to analyze swimming strokes underwater and from different angles to improve skill.  In addition, The Race Club sells swimming DVDs focused on swimming faster.

Olympic medalists from The Race Club World Team

Anthony Ervin
Gary Hall, Sr.
Gary Hall, Jr.
Klete Keller
Nathan Adrian
Milorad Čavić
Mirna Jukić
Duje Draganja
George Bovell
Therese Alshammar
Fernando Scherer

Olympic team members from The Race Club

Mike Bottom, coach 
Henrique Barbosa
Guy Barnea
Ricardo Busquets
Gordan Kožulj
Mario Delač
Brett Hawke
Michelle Engelsman
Fabiola Molina
Mark Foster
Darren Mew
Bartosz Kizierowski
Dominik Meichtry
Igor Marchenko

References

External links
 

Sports clubs established in 2003
Sports clubs in the United States
Swimming organizations
Organizations based in Florida
Sports in Florida
2003 establishments in Florida